Fukagawa Itomaro was the secretary and owner of the A. Farsari & Co. photographic studio. Following the departure of Watanabe Tokutarō in 1904 or shortly thereafter, Fukagawa became the new owner. A. Farsari & Co. was based in Yokohama, Japan.

References
Dobson, Sebastian. "Yokohama Shashin". In Art & Artifice: Japanese Photographs of the Meiji Era – Selections from the Jean S. and Frederic A. Sharf Collection at the Museum of Fine Arts, Boston (Boston: MFA Publications, 2004), 28.

19th-century births
Year of death missing
Japanese businesspeople